Domani Jackson (born c. 2004) is an American football cornerback for the USC Trojans.

Jackson attended Mater Dei High School in Santa Ana, California. He played football and competed in track for Mater Dei. In 2021, he tied the California state record in the 100 meters with a time of 10.25 seconds. As a senior, he missed most of the football season after suffering a knee injury.

He was ranked by ESPN at No. 9 nationally and No. 1 in California in its ranking of the top college recruits in the Class of 2022.  247Sports rated him as the No. 4 recruit nationally.

After narrowing his final choices to USC, Michigan and Alabama, Jackson committed to USC in December 2021.

References

Living people
Year of birth uncertain
American football cornerbacks
USC Trojans football players
Year of birth missing (living people)